The 1899 Merionethshire by-election was a parliamentary by-election held for the House of Commons constituency of Merionethshire on 2 May 1899.

Vacancy
The by-election was caused by the death of the sitting Liberal MP, Thomas Edward Ellis on 5 April 1899.

Candidates
Merionethshire Liberal Association considered a number of possible candidates but the favourite from an early stage was Owen Morgan Edwards, an academic at Lincoln College, Oxford, a native of Merionethshire who was described as an ardent Welsh Nationalist. Edwards was hardly enthusiastic to take up the offer of being the Liberal candidate. He wrote to Dr Edward Jones, chairman of the county Liberals, that he had many days of anxiety and sleepless nights since learning he was the front-runner. He said that he would be relieved if not called upon to stand and would rather not take the position unless absolutely needed.

The Conservatives had fought Merionethshire at the 1895 general election and at its meeting in Dolgellau on 14 April 1899 resolved that the seat should be contested at the by-election. No candidate was selected at that time however and the matter was postponed. Once Edwards was adopted by the Liberals, the Conservatives met again at Barmouth and this time decided not to oppose him.

The result
There being no other candidates putting themselves forward, Edwards was returned unopposed. He did not enjoy parliamentary life however and did not seek re-election at the general election of 1900.

See also
Lists of United Kingdom by-elections 
United Kingdom by-election records

References

1899 elections in the United Kingdom
Unopposed by-elections to the Parliament of the United Kingdom in Welsh constituencies
1899 in Wales
1890s elections in Wales
May 1899 events
History of Merionethshire